Sapelovirus is a genus of viruses in the order Picornavirales, in the family Picornaviridae. Pig serve as natural hosts. There are two species in this genus.

Taxonomy
The genus contains the following species:
Sapelovirus A
Sapelovirus B

Structure
Viruses in Sapelovirus are non-enveloped, with icosahedral, spherical, and round geometries, and T=pseudo3 symmetry. The diameter is around 30 nm. Genomes are linear and non-segmented, around 7.5-8.3kb in length.

Life cycle
Viral replication is cytoplasmic. Entry into the host cell is achieved by attachment of the virus to host receptors, which mediates endocytosis. Replication follows the positive stranded RNA virus replication model. Positive stranded RNA virus transcription is the method of transcription. The virus exits the host cell by lysis, and viroporins. Pig serve as the natural host.

References

External links
 Viralzone: Sapelovirus
 ICTV

Picornaviridae
Virus genera